Patrick D. F. Ion is an American mathematician whose main interest is in mathematical knowledge management.

Ion completed his dissertation on quantum field theory, "Topics in Constructive QFT", in 1972 at the University of London under the supervision of Ray Streater. He continued to work in London,  Groningen and  Heidelberg in the field of quantum stochastics,  q-analogues  and  the  discrete  Fourier  transform in elementary geometry. He has also translated several mathematical monographs, e.g., of Jean-Pierre Serre and Wolfgang Hackbusch.

After joining Mathematical Reviews in 1980, Ion's main focus became the field of mathematical knowledge management. He was since then responsible for the decennial revisions of the Mathematics Subject Classification (MSC). He  is  co-chair  of  the  World Wide Web Consortium Math Working Group, where he developed the MathML specifications. Moreover, he works on the role of the MSC in the Semantic Web, graph structures from bibliographic information of the mathematical literature and its relation to mathematical knowledge and sociology, and digital libraries.

In 2014 he became the chair of the Global Digital Mathematics Library Working Group  of the International Mathematical Union.

References

External links
 Homepage
 
 Patrick Ion's page in Mathematical Reviews 
 Patrick Ion's author profile in zbMATH

Year of birth missing (living people)
Living people
20th-century American mathematicians
Alumni of the University of London
21st-century American mathematicians